Miss Grand Australia is an annual national female beauty pageant in Australia founded in 2014 by Nadasha Zhang, aiming to select the country's representatives to participate at its parent international pageant, Miss Grand International. Its first two editions were held concurrently with Miss Supranational Australia before being held separately after the license was transferred to Dani Fitch in 2017.

The reigning Miss Grand Australia is Amber Sidney of Melbourne who was crowned on 16 July 2022 at the Sofitel Sydney Wentworth Hotel, she will represent the country in Miss Grand International 2022, which was scheduled to be held on 25 October 2022 in Indonesia.

Background

History
Australia has usually been sending its representative to compete at the Miss Grand International since 2013. In 2013–2014, the license belonged to Nadasha Zhang, and was transferred to Renera Thompson in 2015, then to  Dani Fitch and Amber Dew in 2017 and 2023, respectively.  

The first contest of Miss Grand Australia was held in parallel with Miss Supranational Australia in 2014, featuring 19 national finalists, of which "Renera Thompson" was named the winner. Later in 2016, the contest was also held in parallel with Miss Supranational Australia, however, after the license was purchased by Dani Fitch in the following year, the Miss Grand Australia pageant has been arranged independently since then.

Since their first participation in 2013, Australian representatives have consistently placed at least among the top 20 finalists, except in 2022. The highest performance was the first runner-up in 2015, obtained by  who was later promoted to take over the winner title after the original winner,  of the Dominican Republic, had been dethroned. However, Parker was later delegitimized from the position in 2019 due to partaking in Miss Universe Australia 2019.

Editions

Titleholders

Winner gallery

References

External links 

 
 Miss Grand Australia official website

Australia
Recurring events established in 2014
Grand Australia